{{Automatic taxobox
| fossil_range = Eocene - Holocene, 
| image = Quinkana timara skull.jpg
| image_caption = Restoration of the skull of Quinkana timara at the Central Australian Museum| taxon = Mekosuchinae
| authority = Willis, Molnar & Scanlon, 1993
| type_species = Mekosuchus inexpectatus| type_species_authority = Balouet & Buffetaut, 1987
| subdivision_ranks = Genera
| subdivision = * Australosuchus Baru Harpacochampsa?
 Kalthifrons Kambara Mekosuchus Paludirex Quinkana Trilophosuchus Ultrastenos Volia}}
Mekosuchinae is an extinct clade of crocodilians from the Cenozoic of Australasia. They first appear in the fossil record in the Eocene in Australia, and survived until the arrival of humans: in the Pleistocene in Australia and within the Holocene in the Pacific islands of Fiji, New Caledonia and Vanuatu. 

Mekosuchine crocodiles are a diverse group. One of the last species, Mekosuchus inexpectatus from Holocene New Caledonia, may have been arboreal. The early Miocene species Harpacochampsa camfieldensis may have resembled a false gharial. Another mekosuchine fossil, currently undescribed, has been found in Miocene deposits from New Zealand. One genus, Mekosuchus, managed to spread to the islands of the Pacific; it is believed to have island-hopped across the Coral Sea, moving first to a now submerged island known as Greater Chesterfield Island, then New Caledonia and onwards. In the Pleistocene, Quinkana was one of the top terrestrial predators of the Australian continent.

Mekosuchines underwent a drastic decline in post-Miocene Australia, with all genera, except for Quinkana and Paludirex (both perishing during the Quaternary extinction event) becoming extinct in Australia by the end of the Pliocene. After the demise of Quinkana and Pallimnarchus, the group survived on Vanuatu and New Caledonia until the arrival of humans, who are presumed to have driven them to extinction.

Phylogeny

Mekosuchinae is cladistically defined as a node-based taxon composed of the last common ancestor of Kambara implexidens, Mekosuchus inexpectatus, and all of its descendants.

Mekosuchinae is traditionally thought to be included as a basal member Crocodyloidea, although this is disputed. A 2018 tip dating study by Lee & Yates simultaneously using morphological, molecular (DNA sequencing), and stratigraphic (fossil age) data established the inter-relationships within Crocodilia, which was expanded upon in 2021 by Hekkala et al. using paleogenomics by extracting DNA from the extinct Voay''.

The below cladogram shows the results of the latest studies, which placed Mekosuchinae outside of Crocodyloidea, as more basal than Longirostres (the combined group of crocodiles and gavialids).

References

 
Crocodylia incertae sedis
Ypresian first appearances
Paleogene crocodylomorphs
Neogene crocodylomorphs
Holocene extinctions